A.K.M. Rahmatullah (born 4 December 1950) is a Bangladesh Awami League politician and the incumbent Jatiya Sangsad member representing the Dhaka-11 constituency. He also represented the Dhaka-5 and Dhaka-10 in the past.

Career
Rahmatullah was elected to parliament from Dhaka-11 in 2014 as a Bangladesh Awami League candidate. On 10 April 2016, he was appointed the president of South Dhaka unit of the party.

In April 2018, a gunfight between Rahmatullah's supporters and those of Beraid Union Parishad Chairman Jahangir Alam killed one person.

In January 2023, Rahmatullah disclosed that he had been a follower of Ahl-i Hadith organization of Sunni muslims.

References

Living people
1950 births
Awami League politicians
Ahl-i Hadith people
3rd Jatiya Sangsad members
7th Jatiya Sangsad members
9th Jatiya Sangsad members
10th Jatiya Sangsad members
11th Jatiya Sangsad members
Place of birth missing (living people)